Sanga-Sanga Airport (Sinama: Lapagan Sanga-Sanga; Filipino: Paliparan ng Sanga-Sanga) , also known as Tawi-Tawi Airport, is the airport serving the general area of Bongao, the capital of the province of Tawi-Tawi in the Philippines. The airport is classified as a Class 2 principal (minor domestic) airport by the Civil Aviation Authority of the Philippines (CAAP), a body of the Department of Transportation (DOTr) that is responsible for the operations of not only the airport but also of all other airports in the Philippines except the major international airports. It is not an international airport, contrary to its classification by the Tawi-Tawi provincial government. It is located in Sanga-Sanga Island. The airport was formerly referred by the International Air Transport Association (IATA) with the code SGS until the end of 2011, when its IATA code was finally changed to TWT.

In 2005, the runway was extended to 1,860 meters through partnerships between the Department of Transportation and Communications (DOTC, today the DOTr), the CAAP, the United States Agency for International Development (USAID), the regional government of the Autonomous Region in Muslim Mindanao and the Tawi-Tawi provincial government. In addition, the runway has been widened to 30 meters. Along with the expansion of Jolo Airport in Sulu, the expansion of the runway was completed in August 2009.

The new runway was officially inaugurated on August 17, 2009, by US ambassador Kristie Kenney and local officials in Tawi-Tawi.

In 2015, the DOTC allotted Php248 million to jumpstart the renovation of the Sanga-Sanga Airport and additional Php10 million for the fencing requirement expenses of Cagayan de Sulu Airport in the municipality of Mapun, Tawi-Tawi. The DOTC also scheduled to release another Php577 million by January 2016 to finance the further improvement and development of the Sanga-Sanga Airport.

Airlines and destinations
Cebu Pacific operates daily flights to Tawi-Tawi from Zamboanga and vice versa, utilizing the Airbus A320 aircraft. PAL Express also operates 3x weekly flights on the same route sector, also deploying the Airbus A320 aircraft.

See also
List of airports in the Philippines

References

External links

Airports in the Philippines
Buildings and structures in Tawi-Tawi
Transportation in Mindanao
Airfields of the United States Army Air Forces in the Philippines